"Treat Her Like a Lady" is a 1971 single by Cornelius Brothers & Sister Rose. Written by Eddie Cornelius, it was a big success in the American R&B and pop charts reaching the U.S. R&B Top 20 and the Billboard Hot 100 No. 3 in July.  The song also charted in Canada, reaching No. 10.

Billboard ranked "Treat Her Like a Lady" as the No. 15 song for 1971. The record was awarded a gold disc on 2 August 1971 for one million sales by the Recording Industry Association of America (RIAA).

Appearances
"Treat Her Like a Lady" appeared during the opening credits of Anchorman: The Legend of Ron Burgundy.

Chart performance

Weekly singles charts

Year-end charts

Chart run
Billboard Hot 100 (18 weeks, entered April 10): Reached #3 in July

Cashbox (23 weeks, entered March 13): 92, 89, 88, 85, 79, 70, 65, 54, 45, 37, 31, 26, 14, 10, 8, 5, 2, 3, 6, 8, 25, 35, 53

Covers
"Treat Her Like a Lady" was covered on March 30, 2010, during the ninth season of American Idol by Lee DeWyze.

References

1971 singles
Cornelius Brothers & Sister Rose songs
United Artists Records singles
1971 songs